AIPS may refer to:
 Académie Internationale de Philosophie des Sciences
 Australian Institute of Public Safety
 Astronomical Image Processing System
  (International Sports Press Association)
 Advanced IP Softswitch
 Ante Up Intercontinental Poker Series
 Assisted Instrument Purchase Scheme